Francis Osafo Mensah is a Ghanaian politician and a former member of parliament for the Mpraeso constituency of the Eastern Region of Ghana. He was also a former regional minister of the said region and a member of the 4th parliament of the 4th republic of Ghana.

Early life and education 
He was born in the year 1936 to a noble family in the Eastern region. He had his bachelor's degree in Durham University located in the United Kingdom and also majored in Medicine and Surgery.

Career 
Osafo-Mensah is a surgeon by profession. He is also a medical doctor.

Politics 
Mensah's political career begun in 1996 when he contested as a parliamentary candidate on the ticket of the New Patriotic Party as a representative of the Mpraeso constituency. He won this seat with a total of 14,906 votes making 41% of the total votes cast that year. He retained his seat in the 2000 general elections with a total of 13,080 giving 54% of total votes cast. His competitors were on the tickets of; National Democratic Congress (NDC), People's National Convention (PNC), National Reform Party (NRP) and the United Ghana Movement (UGM).

The representatives of the parties were Mike K.S. Akyeampong, Asiamah Godfried Nyarko,Kwabena Adjei and Aninakwa Samuel Kyeramanteng respectively. The NDC had a total votes of 10,318 which is equal to 42.90%. PNC had 265 votes which is equivalent to 1.10%, NRP had 261 which also is equal to 1.10% and the UGM Had 113 votes which is comparable to 0.50% of the total votes cast. Mensah retained his seat for the third time on the ticket of the New Patriotic party in the 2004 general elections with 67.4% of the total votes cast. His parliamentary term ended in 2009.

Personal life 
Francis Osafo-Mensah is a Christian.

See also 

 New Patriotic Party Ministers
 MPs of the Mpraeso constituency

References 

Living people
Ghanaian MPs 1997–2001
Ghanaian MPs 2001–2005
Ghanaian MPs 2005–2009
Government ministers of Ghana
Date of birth missing (living people)
People from Eastern Region (Ghana)
New Patriotic Party politicians
1936 births
Durham University
Ghanaian surgeons
21st-century Ghanaian politicians